The 2020 Sakhir Formula 2 round was a pair of motor races for Formula 2 cars that took place on 28-29 November 2020 at the Bahrain International Circuit in Sakhir, Bahrain as part of the FIA Formula 2 Championship. It was the penultimate round of the 2020 FIA Formula 2 Championship and ran in support of the 2020 Bahrain Grand Prix.

Impact of the COVID-19 pandemic 

The races was originally due to take place on 21-22 March 2020 as the opening round of the championship, but the COVID-19 pandemic led to event organisers initially announcing that no spectators would be permitted to attend the race. On 13 March 2020 the race was indefinitely postponed. It was the second time in Formula Two, then called GP2, history that the Bahrain Grand Prix was postponed after the 2011 Bahrain Grand Prix, which was ultimately cancelled. In its place, an online virtual Grand Prix was held on the original race date featuring racing drivers, celebrities, and e-sport racers. The virtual race was won by  Guanyu Zhou. In August, the Bahrain Grand Prix was rescheduled to 29 November. Due to a surge of COVID-19 cases in the country, organisers announced that the Grand Prix would take place behind closed doors. Local authorities gave special dispensation to allow local health workers to attend with their families.

Report
Callum Ilott took pole for the feature race, 0.391 seconds ahead of Felipe Drugovich. Effective tyre management from Drugovich would help him to achieve his first feature race win, ahead of Ilott. Jehan Daruvala would complete the podium after a long battle with Mick Schumacher. 

Robert Shwartzman took his fourth win, after starting from the reverse-grid pole. The podium was completed by Nikita Mazepin and Louis Delétraz.

Classification

Qualifying 

Notes:
 – Luca Ghiotto received a three-place grid drop for the Feature Race due to impeding Louis Delétraz during Qualifying.

Feature race

Sprint race

Standings after the event

Drivers' Championship standings

Teams' Championship standings

 Note: Only the top five positions are included for both sets of standings.

See also 
2020 Bahrain Grand Prix

References

External links 
 

Sakhir
Sakhir Formula 2